Heinrich Bernhard Rupp (or Ruppius) (born 22 August 1688 in Giessen, died 7 March 1719 in Jena) was a German botanist.

He first studied Medicine in 1704 and met then Johann Jacob Dillenius (1684-1747). He first studied in Iena in 1711, then in Leiden in 1712 then back in Jena in 1713.

Rupp wrote a flora about plants around Jena and part of Thuringia. He published the two first parts but his work is finished after his death by Albrecht von Haller (1708-1777). Carl von Linné (1707-1778) gave tribute to him with the creation of the genus Ruppia of the family Ruppiaceae.

Works 
 Flora Jenensis sive enumeratio plantarum tam sponte circa Jenam et in locis vicinis nascentium, quam in hortis obviarum : methodo conveniente in classes distributa, figurisque rariorum aeneis ornata; in usum botanophilorum Jenensium edita multisque in locis correcta et aucta (Frankfurt am Main and Leipzig, 1726)
 Alberti Haller Flora Jenensis Henrici Bernhardi Ruppii, ex posthumis auctoris schedis et propriis observationibus aucta et emendata; accesserunt plantarum rariorum novae icones (Jena, 1745)

See also 
 List of botanists by author abbreviation (Q–R)

References 

18th-century German botanists
1688 births
1719 deaths
Pre-Linnaean botanists